Jorge Andrés Betancur Bustamante (born 19 August 1991) is a footballer who plays as a forward for Lynx.

Born in Colombia, he is a member, as a naturalised citizen, of the Nicaragua national team.

References

External links

1991 births
Living people
Colombian footballers
Footballers from Medellín
Association football forwards
Uruguayan Segunda División players
Villa Española players
Categoría Primera A players
Atlético Huila footballers
Envigado F.C. players
Colombian expatriate footballers
Colombian expatriate sportspeople in Uruguay
Expatriate footballers in Uruguay
Colombian emigrants to Nicaragua
Naturalized citizens of Nicaragua
Nicaraguan men's footballers
Nicaragua international footballers
2019 CONCACAF Gold Cup players
Nicaraguan Primera División players
Juventus Managua players
Real Estelí F.C. players
Nicaraguan people of Colombian descent